Eurychlamys is a genus of air-breathing land snails, terrestrial pulmonate gastropod mollusks in the family Helicarionidae. These snails are restricted to Western Ghats of India and Sri Lanka.

Three species are recognized.

Species
 Eurychlamys platychlamys (Blanford, 1881)
 Eurychlamys todarum (W. T. Blanford & H. F. Blanford, 1861)
 Eurychlamys vilipensa (Benson, 1853)

References